Senator Sherburne may refer to:

John C. Sherburne (1883–1959), Vermont State Senate
Moses Sherburne (1808–1868), Maine State Senate